VPM may refer to:

 Value process management
 Varying Permeability Model
 Ventral posteromedial nucleus, a nucleus of the thalamus; part of the brain.
 Virginia Payload Module, a weapon system planned for Block 5 of the US Navy's Virginia-class submarine
 Volcanic passive margin
 VPM Media Corporation
 Vranken Pommery Monopole
 Virtual Public Meeting

Radio stations
 VPM-FM, a radio station in Belize
 Three related public radio stations in Virginia
 WBBT-FM, branded as VPM Music,
 WWLB, branded as VPM Music
 WCVE-FM, branded as VPM News